East Mersea is a scattered village and civil parish on Mersea Island in the English county of Essex.
It was historically referred to as Mersea in the Domesday book

St Edmund's Church 
The Grade I listed parish Church of St Edmund King and Martyr dates from the 12th or 13th century with the nave and tower dating from the 14th and 15th century respectively. The oak and red-brick south porch is 19th century.  Inside there is a 15th-century octagonal font and mid-17th century pulpit.

The rector at East Mersey from 1871 to 1881 was the scholar Sabine Baring-Gould who wrote the words for the hymn Onward Christian Soldiers.

Grave of Sarah Wrench
The grave of Sarah Wrench (1833–1848), by the North wall of the chancel at St. Edmund's Church in East Mersea is unusual for an English grave because it is covered by a mortsafe, a protective cage used at the time in Scotland to protect corpses from graverobbers.

Richard Jones, in Myths of Britain and Ireland, refers to popular speculation that Sarah Wrench was a witch, and that the cage was designed to keep her from escaping her grave after death. Although East Anglia was at one time known for witch trials, this was in the sixteenth and seventeenth centuries, not the mid-nineteenth.

Notes

References

External links

Villages in Essex
Civil parishes in Essex
Mersea Island